Sharpe is an unincorporated community in Coffey County, Kansas, United States.

History
A post office was opened in Sharpe in 1890, and remained in operation until being discontinued in 1918.

References

Further reading

External links
 Coffey County maps: Current, Historic, KDOT

Unincorporated communities in Coffey County, Kansas
Unincorporated communities in Kansas